The Dyn'Aéro R180 is a France amateur-built aircraft that was designed and produced by Dyn'Aéro of Darois. When it was available the aircraft was supplied as plans and as a kit for amateur construction.

As of March 2017 the design is no longer advertised as available by the company.

Design and development
The R180 was designed for competition aerobatics and also as a military trainer. It features a cantilever low-wing, low-mounted tailplane, a two-seats-in-side-by-side configuration enclosed cockpit under a bubble canopy, fixed conventional landing gear with wheel pants and a single engine in tractor configuration. A tricycle landing gear version was also designed.

The aircraft is made from wood and carbon fibre. The standard engine specified is the  Lycoming O-360 four-stroke aircraft engine.

Operational history
Reviewers Roy Beisswenger and Marino Boric described the design in a 2015 review as having better control harmony than the Mudry CAP 10.

Specifications (R180)

See also
List of aerobatic aircraft

References

Homebuilt aircraft
Single-engined tractor aircraft